Lahontan can refer to:

 Lake Lahontan
 Lahontan Dam
 Lake Lahontan (reservoir)
 Louis-Armand de Lom d'Arce de Lahontan, Baron de Lahontan
 Lahontan State Recreation Area
 Lahontan, Pyrénées-Atlantiques, a commune in the Pyrénées-Atlantiques département of France